The Mike Douglas Show was an American daytime television talk show that was hosted by Mike Douglas. It began as a local program in Cleveland before being carried on other stations owned by Westinghouse Broadcasting.  The show went into national syndication and was moved to Philadelphia in 1965. The program remained on television until 1981. It was distributed by Westinghouse Broadcasting, and for much of its run, originated from studios at two of the company's TV stations in Cleveland and Philadelphia.

History in Cleveland
The Mike Douglas Show premiered on KYW-TV in Cleveland on December 11, 1961, and featured a mix of light banter with guests and musical performances, along with more serious interviews with prominent newsmakers.  Local entertainment shows were popular in the early days of television.  Joining Douglas as part of the everyday lineup was the Ellie Frankel Trio, a local jazz group.  Instead of an opening comedic monologue (as was the case with The Tonight Show Starring Johnny Carson, for example), Douglas, given his vocalist background, would begin each show by singing a popular song for the audience. Each week would have a different co-host who would appear every day with Douglas.

The inevitable growing pains of a new program were evident during the first week of shows, when the scheduled co-host, Irish singer Carmel Quinn, missed the first two shows due to a scheduling conflict in New York. In addition, faulty microphones on the inaugural broadcast were coupled with equally problematic chairs that caused a pair of guests to fall off stage.

Some moments of controversy developed in the opening months, including a guest's satirical look at First Lady Jacqueline Kennedy's televised tour of the White House that was criticized for bad taste, and a look at censorship that was to involve the reading of selections from books such as Lady Chatterley's Lover and Tropic of Cancer. The show was postponed until a representative for banning such books could be found.

In February 1963, singer Barbra Streisand was the show's co-host. During that week, she was performing in a local strip club, and was asked by the club owner to promote her appearances on The Mike Douglas Show each day. The reason given was that Cleveland newspapers were in the midst of a lengthy labor strike, preventing any consistent advertising. Douglas later said that the station erased the videotapes of Streisand's appearance, as most early television programs did, in order to re-use them for station editorials.

Just a few months later, Douglas had atheist Madalyn Murray as a guest, three days after the U.S. Supreme Court had ruled in her favor in the Abington School District v. Schempp case, which banned mandatory Bible reading in public schools.

In September 1963, The Mike Douglas Show was syndicated to four other television stations owned by Westinghouse: KDKA-TV in Pittsburgh, WBZ-TV in Boston, WJZ-TV in Baltimore and KPIX in San Francisco. Less than one year later, the show had expanded to a total of 27 cities.

On November 22, 1963, Douglas was speaking with Federal Housing Administrator Robert C. Weaver, when station newscaster John Dancy interrupted the live broadcast by walking through the audience in order to give the first reports of the assassination of President John F. Kennedy. The show soon ended as NBC began its four-day coverage of the tragedy.

On July 23, 1964, comedian Henry Morgan made a brief appearance at the start of the show, but later walked out when Douglas was interviewing Dr. Sam Sheppard, who had been released from prison one week earlier.

History in Philadelphia

In 1965, the Federal Communications Commission (FCC) reversed a 1956 station switch, in which NBC strong-armed Westinghouse to move to Cleveland, so it could have a station in the much larger Philadelphia market. With NBC forced to move back to Cleveland, Westinghouse regained control of what had been NBC-owned WRCV-TV in Philadelphia and renamed the station KYW-TV. NBC, which now owned the former KYW-TV as WKYC-TV, tried to buy The Mike Douglas Show to keep it in Cleveland. However, it was the only real big moneymaker for Westinghouse's syndication unit at the time, so the show moved with KYW-TV to eastern Pennsylvania in August.

At first, The Mike Douglas Show was broadcast from a 140-seat basement studio located in the WRCV/KYW building at 1619 Walnut Street (see photos on right). It continued to be aired live until the following year when Zsa Zsa Gabor called Morey Amsterdam a "son of a bitch" for interrupting her joke during the April 29, 1966, program. After that, the program aired on a one-day tape delay basis, allowing for the editing out of any objectionable material. Live broadcasts (with a seven-second delay) were attempted only on a few special occasions thereafter, such as when the Philadelphia Flyers won the Stanley Cup.

Future political consultant and Fox News Channel founder and CEO Roger Ailes served as a producer beginning in 1965, then as executive producer from 1967–68. It was while working on the show in 1967 that he met Richard Nixon, with whom he had an off-air discussion about television and politics. Nixon subsequently hired Ailes to work as a media consultant on his 1968 presidential campaign, thus launching Ailes's career as a national political consultant and media strategist.

In July 1972, the show moved to a new studio in the newly constructed KYW-TV studios at 5th and Market streets in Center City Philadelphia. That studio ("Studio A") was the first and only studio especially constructed for the program. While the overall new studio was larger, it accommodated only 120 seats. Ellie Frankel continued as musical director until 1967, when Joe Harnell, an accomplished musician, composer, and bandleader took over the position until 1973. Harnell was followed by Frank Hunter, and the show ended with Joe Massimino in that role.

During much of its time on the air, the show remained strong in ratings, consistently finishing among the most popular daytime television shows nearly every season. Douglas took the success lightly. He made a surprise visit in 1976 to the set of Match Game, a competing program that managed to score higher ratings than The Mike Douglas Show during the mid-1970s.  Douglas wanted to congratulate host Gene Rayburn on making his game show the #1 daytime TV program.

The show's run spanned 21 years and more than 4,000 episodes. In 1978, production of the show moved to CBS Television City in Hollywood, where it remained until the end of the show's run in 1981.

In the fall of 1980, Westinghouse dropped Douglas, deciding to give younger entertainer John Davidson the show.  Douglas' show continued, with Syndicast taking over the program's distribution. However, in an effort to boost falling ratings during the show's final season, a third of the staff was fired and the program was revamped with a traveling roadshow format, re-titled The Mike Douglas Entertainment Hour. The format change did not help, and Douglas' show was canceled at the end of the 1981–82 season.  The last episode aired on November 30, 1981.

Awards

References

External links
 , licensing link for The Mike Douglas Show, with clips from King World Productions, now part of CBS Television Distribution
 
 

1961 American television series debuts
1982 American television series endings
1960s American television talk shows
1970s American television talk shows
1980s American television talk shows
Black-and-white American television shows
English-language television shows
First-run syndicated television programs in the United States
Television in Cleveland
Television in Philadelphia
Television series by CBS Studios
Westinghouse Broadcasting